I Ketut Ariana (born 6 September 1989) is an Indonesian Olympic weightlifter. He represented his country at the 2016 Summer Olympics.

References 

1989 births
Living people
People from Jembrana Regency
Sportspeople from Bali
Indonesian male weightlifters
Balinese people
Weightlifters at the 2016 Summer Olympics
Olympic weightlifters of Indonesia
Weightlifters at the 2014 Asian Games
Southeast Asian Games gold medalists for Indonesia
Southeast Asian Games medalists in weightlifting
Weightlifters at the 2018 Asian Games
Competitors at the 2017 Southeast Asian Games
Asian Games competitors for Indonesia
21st-century Indonesian people